Jameson Clark (8 July 1907, Kilbirnie, North Ayrshire, Scotland – 4 January 1984, Kilbirnie, Ayrshire, Scotland) was a Scottish character actor who appeared in 22 films and made many appearances on television.

Career
His first appearance in a major film was the British production Whisky Galore! (1949), playing Constable Macrae, a role he would reprise in the sequel, Rockets Galore! (1957) His early roles were all to a Scottish typecast, and he made 13 films, including The Maggie (1954) and X the Unknown (1956) in which he portrayed Scottish characters, before he was given the part of an English tugboat captain in The Key (1958).

He appeared as McDougal in Ralph Thomas's re-make of John Buchan's The 39 Steps (1959), which also starred Kenneth More as Richard Hannay. The last of his four films released in 1959 was Charles Crichton's The Battle of the Sexes, playing Andrew Darling, with Peter Sellers and Robert Morley heading the cast.

After playing Sir Alan in the film Tunes of Glory (1960), he portrayed the Constable in Greyfriars Bobby: The True Story of a Dog (1961), a film based on the novel by Eleanor Atkinson, which recounts the tale of the Skye Terrier who would not leave his master's grave.

Clark briefly appeared on television, playing Jamie Lang in an episode of the British police series No Hiding Place ("Whistle and I'll Come", 1961). After playing George Lockwood in the film A Pair of Briefs (1962), Clark returned to TV as a Foreman in an episode of the Suspense anthology series ("Diversion to Danger", 1963). He would remain on the small screen for the next six years, in such series as The Troubleshooters and Dr. Finlay's Casebook, also re-surfacing in No Hiding Place, this time as Harry Armstrong in the episode "All Dead and Buried" (1963).

Clark's final film was Ring of Bright Water (1969), playing the Storekeeper in the film about otters based on the book by the naturalist Gavin Maxwell. From then until his retirement in 1980, he concentrated once more on contributions to television projects, amongst which were Sutherland's Law, The Prime of Miss Jean Brodie, Play for Today and Enemy of the People.

Clark died on 4 January 1984 aged 76.

Filmography

References

External links

1907 births
1984 deaths
Scottish male film actors
People from Kilbirnie
20th-century Scottish male actors